El Anunciador de Cortés was an independent weekly newspaper published from San Pedro Sula, Honduras. It was published 1914-1917 and again in 1919. José Maria Nuila was the owner, director and editor of the newspaper.

References

1914 establishments in Honduras
1919 disestablishments
Weekly newspapers
Newspapers published in Honduras
Spanish-language newspapers